Football Club Green-Boys 77 Harlange-Tarchamps is a football club, based in Harlange, in north-western Luxembourg. They play their home games at Stade "Am Duerf".

History
The FC Green-Boys was formed after a vote on 14 May 1977 by members of two teams, F.C. Harlange 1963 and F.C. Tarwat Tarchamps 1948, the result of which was the clubs' merger into the new side. Their first chairman was Schmitt Armand from Tarchamps. The newly formed team started playing in the Luxembourg 3. Division.

Promotions and relegations
1979: Promotion to Luxembourg 2. Division
1981: Relegation to Luxembourg 3. Division
1988: Promotion to Luxembourg 2. Division
1991: Promotion to Luxembourg 1. Division
1993: Promotion to Luxembourg Division of Honour
1994: Relegation to Luxembourg 1. Division
1995: Relegation to Luxembourg 2. Division
1997: Promotion to Luxembourg 1. Division
2010: Promotion to Luxembourg Division of Honour
2011: Relegation to Luxembourg 1. Division
2015: Relegation to Luxembourg 2. Division

External links
FC Green Boys 77 Harlange-Tarchamps official website

Green Boys
1977 establishments in Luxembourg